Anan Zaman (born 12 October 1978) is a Bangladeshi playwright and theatre artist. His plays include Shikhandi Kotha, Secret of History, and Shrabon Tragedy.

Early life 
Anan Zaman was born on 12 October 1978 in Golaidanga Village, Singair Upazila, Manikganj District. His father Jalal Uddin used to sing the "Bhab-Boithaki" song along with teaching. Taslima Jalal, his mother is a homemaker. During his primary education, Anan Zaman used to write rhymes and poems.

Education and teaching 
Anan Zaman took admission to the Department of Government and Politics at Jagannath University in the 1995–1996 session. In the 1996–1997 session, he took admission to the Department of Drama and Drama Theory at Jahangirnagar University. There, under the direct supervision of playwright Selim Al Deen, his theatre practice gained a grammatical basis. In 2006, he joined the same university as a teacher of the same department. While directing plays, he has received the companionship and direct supervision of Acharya Selim Al Deen, Nasir Uddin Yusuf, Azad Abul Kalam and Yusuf Hasan Arko.

Theatre life 
Prior to 1990, Snejuti Natyagoshthi, a theatre group used to perform Jatra Pala regularly in Golaidanga, Jamsha area. While studying in class 8, Anan Zaman formed a different theatre platform for youth named  Kishore Snejuti Natyagoshthi. He performed his own composition Rudrolila in the form of Jatra Pala. Under the banner of this group, he staged three plays in the form of Jatra Natok which are Shwarther Khela, Samajer Artanad, and Boshonter Nil Nokkhotro. He formed a theatre group named Hakim Ali Gayen Theatre in 1996. In 1998 he formed Bunon Theatre in Savar. In 2001, he joined a theatre group, Mahakal Natya somproday as the playwright. He formed Nirabharan Theatre in Singair in 2008.

He has introduced the yearly theatre festival Natgeet GeetNatter Mela from Hakim Ali Gayen Theatre and set up an open platform for theatre performance from the same theatre. He has introduced a fair named Janmo Snajher Sajkaj from Nirabharan Theatre. All three theatre groups are active members of the Bangladesh Group Theatre Federation. These theatre groups staged various plays namely Tarjanpad, Shikhandi Kotha, Shunya, Sangpala, and Billy Gantha from Hakim Ali Gayen Theatre; Suswar Pratibimbo, Bilay Gantha, Balika o Swarnapasham Bherar Natyosamantanathi, and Jnuimalar Soimala from Nirabharan Theatre; Shaksha, Bilay Gnatha, Bhutkabya, and Secret of History from Bunbon Theatre; and others.

The play Secret of History, written about the political situation after the assassination of Bangabandhu Sheikh Mujibur Rahman, was widely praised all over the country. In 2002, Mahakal Natya Sampradaya brought the play Shikhandikatha on stage under the direction of Dr. Rashid Harun, Professor f Jahangirnagar University. The play is about the inhuman condition of the transgender community in Bangladesh. It sets a different precedent in the history of Bengali theatre. Being staged, the play helped to grow a positive attitude towards the transgender community. Later, the Government of the People's Republic of Bangladesh recognized transgender people as the third gender and gave them the right to vote, and facilitated them with old age allowance.

The three theatre groups continue to perform regularly under the direction of Ashiq Rahman, Mostafizur Rahaman, and Yusuf Hasan Arko. It is to be noted that a theatre festival named the National Shikhandikatha Natya Utsab was held on the play Shikhandikatha with the production of nine teams directed by nine directors. In 2015, Dhaka Theatre staged Raikathakata, written by Anon Zaman under the direction of Ehsanur Rahman. In 2017, Mahakal Natya Sampradaya brought to the stage the play Shrabon Tragedy under the direction of Dhaka University teacher Ashiq Rahman which was based on the life of Bangabandhu.

Film and television 
Shikhandi katha became popular among people through theatre, television drama, and film. Anan Zaman's first film Biyer Lagna, directed by FI Manik was released simultaneously in India and Bangladesh in 2006. His notable television dramas include Ratri Rother Ultopith, Ratrir Khamokha Kheyal, Ashalota O Mando Batasher Galpo, Food station Nineteen Attack, Abbas Mia O Shada Parir Galpo, Simantahin Pakhi, etc.

Award 
Anan Zaman won the Bachsas Awards for Best Dialogue Writer in 2013 for his film Shikhandi Kotha (2013).

References 

1978 births
People from Manikganj District
Jahangirnagar University alumni
Bangladeshi male writers
Bengali-language writers
Bengali writers
Bangladeshi dramatists and playwrights
Academic staff of Jahangirnagar University
Male dramatists and playwrights
Living people